This is a list of British television related events from 1964.

Events

January
1 January – The first ever episode of the long-running pop music show Top of the Pops airs on BBC TV.
4 January – Test transmissions begin for BBC2.

February
9 February – Launch of BBC Wales TV.

March
6 March – Vision On, the first ever program for deaf children, is launched on BBC TV.
30 March – Tyne Tees Television's regional news magazine North East Roundabout is relaunched as North East Newsview.

April
1 April – The Bressay transmitting station in the Shetland Islands comes into service, making the islands the last area of the United Kingdom to get a television transmitter.
6 April – Associated-Rediffusion changes its name to Rediffusion, London.
20 April – The scheduled opening night of BBC Two, the UK's third television channel, is disrupted by power cuts in London, and all that can be screened is announcer Gerald Priestland delivering apologies from Alexandra Palace. The existing BBC TV channel is renamed BBC1.
21 April – Play School is first broadcast on BBC2; the launch schedule, abandoned on the previous day, is shown in full this evening. 
26 April – News Review, a summary of the week's news with subtitles for the deaf and hard-of-hearing, is broadcast for the first time as part of the launch of BBC2.
29 April – ITV launches in the south west, broadcasting as Westward Television. 
30 April – Television sets manufactured as of this date are required to receive UHF channels.

May
5 May – The documentary film Seven Up! is broadcast on ITV, showing the lives of fourteen school children. Subsequent films in the series see them interviewed every seven years.
12 May – ITV London region starts showing the US science fiction horror anthology series The Twilight Zone.
13 May – The character Martha Longhurst dies of a heart attack in the snug of The Rovers Return on Coronation Street.
30 May – The 26-part documentary series The Great War covering events in World War I begins airing on the BBC.

June
No events.

July
July – Associated Television's series Emergency – Ward 10 shows the first kiss on television between black and white actors, Joan Hooley playing surgeon Louise Mahler and John White playing Dr. Giles Farmer.

August
4 August – The first portable televisions go on sale.
22 August – The first Match of the Day airs on BBC2. The following episodes move to BBC1.

September
18 September – Doctor Who goes to air on NZBC in New Zealand making it the first country outside of Great Britain to broadcast the long-running science fiction series. It will first air in the region of Christchurch from 18 September to 11 December 1964, then in Auckland from 30 October 1964 to 29 January 1965, Wellington from 6 November 1964 to 5 February 1965 and Dunedin from 5 March to 28 May 1965.
28 September – In the Midlands, BBC One airs the first edition of its local news programme, Midlands Today.

October
9 October – Southern launches a weekly news magazine for the south east called Friday at Ten.
10 October – The 1964 Summer Olympics opening ceremony at Tokyo, Japan, with first time of live Olympic telecast program by geostationary communication satellite.
13 October – Danger Man (US: Secret Agent) returns to ITV in longer episodes after being cancelled in 1961.
28 October – The Wednesday Play premieres on BBC1.

November
2 November – ATV's soap opera Crossroads premieres on ITV.

December
6 December – BBC2 goes on air in the Midlands and East Anglia. The Sutton Coldfield transmitting station initially cannot relay BBC2 beyond an area reception to the Midlands region, resulting in a staggered signal.
15 December – Peter Watkins' docudrama Culloden is shown on BBC1.

Undated
 Some 90% of British households now own a television, compared to around 25% in 1953 and 65% in 1959.

New channels

Debuts

BBC Television Service/BBC TV/BBC1
1 January – Top of the Pops (1964–2006, 2006–present at Christmas)
19 January – Martin Chuzzlewit (1964)
6 March – Vision On (1964–1976)
30 March – Detective (1964–1969)
6 April – Cluff (1964–1965)
11 April – Baxter On... (1964)
19 April – 
Hamlet at Elsinore (1964)
Rupert of Hentzau (1964)
3 May – The Kathy Kirby Show (1964–1966)
18 May – Sherlock Holmes (1964–1968)
31 May – Silas Marner (1964)
9 June – The Graham Stark Show (1964)
21 June – The Roy Castle Show (1964–1970)
1 July – Catch Hand (1964)
2 July – Call the Gun Expert (1964)
4 July – The Four Seasons of Rosie Carr (1964)
5 July – The Indian Tales of Rudyard Kipling (1964)
6 July – Thorndyke (1964)
9 July – The Valiant Varneys (1964–1965)
12 July – Smuggler's Bay (1964)
26 July – Kipling (1964)
31 July – A World of His Own (1964–1965)
8 August – Diary of a Young Man (1964)
13 August – Lance at Large (1964)
18 August – Swizzlewick (1964)
23 August – The Children of the New Forest (1964)
18 September – The Big Noise (1964)
28 September – Midlands Today (1964–present)
30 September – The Wednesday Play (1964–1970)
4 October – The Count of Monte Cristo (1964)
22 October – Bewitched (1964–1972)
28 October – Curtain of Fear (1964)
13 November – Not So Much a Programme, More a Way of Life (1964–1965)
19 November – The Singing Ringing Tree (1957)
20 November – R3 (1964–1965)
4 December – The Likely Lads (1964–1966)
11 December – Frankie Howerd (1964–1966)
15 December – Culloden (1964)
19 December – Scott On... (1964–1965; 1968–1972; 1974)

BBC2
21 April – 
Play School (1964–1988)
Jazz 625 (1964–1966)
23 April – Late Night Line-Up (1964–1972)
24 April – Story Parade  (1964–1965)
25 April – Madame Bovary (1964)
26 April – Melissa (1964)
27 April – Impromptu (1964)
2 May – 
Horizon (1964—present)
Theatre 625 (1964–1968)
23 May – Ann Veronica (1964)
30 May – The Great War (1964)
20 June – Mary Barton (1964)
21 June – The Midnight Men (1964)
6 July – The Beat Room (1964–1965)
18 July – Witch Wood (1964)
2 August – The Sleeper (1964)
22 August – Match of the Day (1964–present)
12 September – The Ordeal of Richard Feverel (1964)
12 September – The Massingham Affair (1964)
8 October – The Old Wives' Tale (1964)
8 October – Thursday Theatre (1964–1965)
14 November – Esther Waters (1964)
19 November – Simon and Laura (1964)
29 November – Not Only... But Also (1964–1966; 1970)
12 December – Six (1964–1965) (Anthology series)
13 December – The Brothers Karamazov (1964–1965)
25 December – Muses with Milligan (1964–1965)
Unknown – The Virginian (1962–1971)

ITV
2 January – Foreign Affairs (1964)
3 January – It's Dark Outside (1964–1965)
6 January – Second City Reports (1964)
7 January – The Fugitive (1963–1967)
17 January – A Touch of the Norman Vaughans (1964)
19 January – Studio '64 (1964)
12 February – How to Be an Alien (1964)
28 February – The Villains (1964–1965)
3 March – The Barnstormers (1964)
28 March – The Protectors (1964)
16 April – The Outer Limits (1963–1965)
5 May – Seven Up! (1964–present)
14 May – Cinema (1964–1975)
5 July – 
Blackpool Night Out (1964–1965)
Miss Adventure (1964)
9 July – The Hidden Truth (1964)
16 July – HMS Paradise (1964–1965)
10 August – A Choice of Coward (1964)
29 August – Fire Crackers (1964–1965)
4 September – It's a Woman's World (1964)
29 September – Mike (1964)
2 October – Paris 1900 (1964)
3 October – The Sullavan Brothers (1964–1965)
4 October – 
The Eamonn Andrews Show (1964–1969)
Stingray (1964–1965)
10 October – Voyage to the Bottom of the Sea (1964–1968)
17 October – Redcap (1964–1966)
21 October – Dave's Kingdom (1964)
2 November – Crossroads (1964–1988, 2001–2003)
13 November – Victoria Regina (1964)
14 November – Gideon's Way (1964–1966)
29 November – Just Jimmy (1964–1968)
16 December – It's Tarbuck (1964–1965, 1970–1973)
21 December – That's for Me (1964–1965)

Television shows

Returning this year after a break of one year or longer
13 October – Danger Man (1960–1961, 1964–1968)

Continuing television shows

1920s
BBC Wimbledon (1927–1939, 1946–2019, 2021–2024)

1930s
The Boat Race (1938–1939, 1946–2019)
BBC Cricket (1939, 1946–1999, 2020–2024)

1940s
Come Dancing (1949–1998)

1950s
Andy Pandy (1950–1970, 2002–2005)
Watch with Mother (1952–1975) 
Rag, Tag and Bobtail (1953–1965)
The Good Old Days (1953–1983)
Panorama (1953–present)
Picture Book (1955–1965)
Sunday Night at the London Palladium (1955–1967, 1973–1974)
Take Your Pick! (1955–1968, 1992–1998)
Double Your Money (1955–1968)
Dixon of Dock Green (1955–1976)
Crackerjack (1955–1984, 2020–present)
Opportunity Knocks (1956–1978, 1987–1990)
This Week (1956–1978, 1986–1992)
Armchair Theatre (1956–1974)
What the Papers Say (1956–2008)
The Sky at Night (1957–present)
Picture Book (1958–1965)
Blue Peter (1958–present)
Grandstand (1958–2007)
Noggin the Nog (1959–1965, 1970, 1979–1982)

1960s
Sykes and A... (1960–1965)
The Flintstones (1960–1966)
Coronation Street (1960–present)
The Avengers (1961–1969)
Points of View (1961–present)
Songs of Praise (1961–present)
Compact (1962–1965)
Steptoe and Son (1962–1965, 1970–1974)
Hugh and I (1962–1967)
The Saint (1962–1969)
Z-Cars (1962–1978)
Animal Magic (1962–1983)
The Human Jungle (1963–1965)
Ready Steady Go! (1963–1966)
Doctor Who (1963–1989, 1996, 2005–present)
World in Action (1963–1998)

Ending this year
 Boyd Q.C. (1956–1964)
 Gwlad y Gan (1958–1964)
 Ghost Squad (1961–1964)
 Happily Ever After (1961–1964)
 The Human Jungle (1963–1964)

Births
 12 January – Clare Holman, actress (Inspector Morse)
 13 January – Bill Bailey, comedian
 1 February – Linus Roache, actor
 3 February – Gary Webster, actor
 16 February – Christopher Eccleston, actor
 24 February – Andy Crane, television and radio presenter
 25 February – Lee Evans, comedian and actor
 11 March – Shane Richie, actor
 25 April – Fiona Bruce, journalist, newsreader and television presenter
 13 June – Kathy Burke, actress and comedian
 18 June – Linda Davidson, actress, writer and media executive
 27 June – Lynn Parsons, radio and television presenter
 3 July – Fionnuala Ellwood, actress
 12 July – Gaby Roslin, television presenter and actress
 21 July – Ross Kemp, actor and journalist
 22 July – Bonnie Langford, actress and entertainer
 23 July – Matilda Ziegler, actress
 25 August – Clive Myrie, news presenter
 27 August – Cheryl Fergison, actress
 1 October – Harry Hill, comedian, television presenter and author, previously a medical doctor
 8 October – Ian Hart, actor
 18 November – Nadia Sawalha, actress and television presenter 
 19 November – Susie Dent, lexicographer on Countdown
 21 November – Liza Tarbuck, actress and television presenter
 26 November – Lia Williams, actress and director

Deaths
 24 February – Frank Conroy, actor, aged 73
 25 September – Robert Wilson, singer and TV presenter, aged 57
 10 December – Charles Samuel Franklin, radio and television engineer, designer of broadcasting antennae and aerials, aged 85

See also
 1964 in British music
 1964 in British radio
 1964 in the United Kingdom
 List of British films of 1964

References